The 2018 season is Kelantan's 10th season in the Malaysia Super League (Malay: Liga Super Malaysia) since being promoted and 23rd successive season in the top flight of Malaysian football league system.

Sponsors
Title Sponsor

 BMW

Shirt Sponsor

 Lotto

Co-Sponsors
 aL-ikhsaN
 Al-Quds Umrah & Tours
 Konsortium e-Mutiara
 ROHM Semiconductor
 Yakult

Partners
 MESRA Medicare
 Excel Printing & Copy Centre
 Pakaq Gomo Gym
 Exa Supply

Club officials

Coaching staff

Other information

|-

Squad information

First team squad

 U21 = Under-21 player

New contracts

Transfers

In

First window

Second window

Out

First window

Loan out

First window

Out

Second window

Pre-season and friendlies

Super Cup
On 8 December 2017, it was announced that Kelantan would face Persija Jakarta of Indonesia and Ratchaburi of Thailand as part of the 2018 Boost SportsFix Super Cup, a round-robin tournament. All matches played at the National Stadium, Bukit Jalil, Kuala Lumpur.

Competitions

Malaysia Super League

League table

Result summary

Results by matchday

Matches

The fixtures for the 2018 Malaysia Super League season were announced on 11 January 2018.

Malaysia FA Cup

Kelantan entered the 2018 Malaysia FA Cup in the second round as all 12 Malaysia Super League clubs received a bye to that stage. Matches were played between 2–3 March 2018.

Malaysia Cup

Group stage

Knockout phase

Quarter-finals

Statistics

Appearances

Top scorers
The list is sorted by shirt number when total goals are equal.
† Players who left the club in mid season.

Top assists
The list is sorted by shirt number when total goals are equal.
† Players who left the club in mid season.

Clean sheets
The list is sorted by shirt number when total clean sheets are equal.
† Players who left the club in mid season.

Summary

Home attendance

U21s

U19s

Source: FAM

References

2018
Malaysian football clubs 2018 season
Kelantan FA